Pinto da Costa may refer to:

Manuel Pinto da Costa, twice president of São Tomé and Príncipe
Jorge Nuno Pinto da Costa, chairman of FC Porto